I Was Here for a Moment, Then I Was Gone is the third studio album by English post-rock band Maybeshewill. It was released on 11 June 2011 by Function Records.

Critical reception
I Was Here for a Moment, Then I Was Gone was met with "generally favorable" reviews from critics. At Metacritic, which assigns a weighted average rating out of 100 to reviews from mainstream publications, this release received an average score of 76 based on 4 reviews.

In a review for NME, critic reviewer Abby Tayleure wrote: "Their first studio-recorded album, after working on the other two in a spare bedroom, took a grand total of 18 months to put together and is reminiscent of the likes of 65daysofstatic, Mogwai and Glassjaw. Epic guitars, crashing drums and intense keys – it’s a dramatic record that will shake your bones. Tim Newbound of Rock Sound called the release the "most ball-bustingly intense and breathtakingly beautiful thing" the band has ever done.

Track listing

References

External links
 
 

2011 albums
Maybeshewill albums